Michael Sharpe (born 8 October 1966) is a New Zealand cricketer. He played in 21 first-class and 34 List A matches for Canterbury from 1990 to 1997.

See also
 List of Canterbury representative cricketers

References

External links
 

1966 births
Living people
Canterbury cricketers
Cricketers from Dannevirke
New Zealand cricketers
South Island cricketers